Steinman is a surname. Notable people with the surname include:

Alan M. Steinman (born 1945), American physician, United States Coast Guard admiral and activist
David Steinman, American environmentalist and writer
David B. Steinman (1886–1960), American structural engineer
Eliezer Steinman (1892–1970), Israeli writer, journalist and editor
Jim Steinman (1947–2021), American rock composer and pianist
Ralph M. Steinman (1943–2011), Canadian immunologist and cell biologist, Nobel prize winner 2011
Sonia Steinman Gold (1917–2009), American alleged spy for the Soviet Union

Fictional characters
Dr. Steinman, a character in the Bioshock video game series

See also
Steinman, Virginia, a community in the United States
Aharon Leib Shteinman (c. 1912 – 2017), Israeli rabbi
Steinmann